"Copines" is a song performed by French-Malian singer Aya Nakamura. It was released on 24 August, 2018. The song peaked at number one in France and number 7 in Wallonia. The song's music video garnered over 350 million views.

Charts

Weekly charts

Year-end charts

Certifications

References

2018 singles
2018 songs
Aya Nakamura songs
Number-one singles in France
French-language songs
Songs written by Aya Nakamura